Pegah may refer to:

People
 Pegah Ahangarani(born 1984), Iranian actress
 Pegah Anvarian, Iranian/Persian and a Los Angeles-based fashion designer
 Pegah Ahmadi (born 1974), Iranian poet, scholar, literary critic and translator of poetry
Pegah Emami  Iranian/Persian and a DC-based Gov contractors' accountant

Other uses
 Pegah F.C., an Iranian football club based in Rasht, Gilan, Iran
 Pegah Golpayegan, a dairy factory in Iran